Vladimir Ivanovich Lemeshev (born 3 May 1911 in St. Petersburg; died 27 February 1976 in Leningrad) was a Soviet Russian football player and coach.

He was a younger brother of Konstantin Lemeshev.

External links
 

1911 births
Footballers from Saint Petersburg
1976 deaths
Soviet footballers
Soviet Top League players
FC Dynamo Saint Petersburg players
Soviet football managers
FC Zenit Saint Petersburg managers
Association football defenders
Association football midfielders
Burials at Bogoslovskoe Cemetery
FC Dynamo Kazan players